William Mompesson (1639 – 7 March 1709) was a Church of England priest whose decisive action when his Derbyshire parish, Eyam, became infected with the plague in the 17th century averted more widespread catastrophe.

The earliest reference to him is in Alumni Cantabrigienses, he was baptized at Collingham, West Yorkshire on 28 April 1639, he attended school in Sherburn  and went to Peterhouse, Cambridge University, in 1655, graduating BA 1659 and MA 1662. He was ordained in 1660. After a period of service as chaplain to Sir George Saville, later (1679) Lord Halifax, he came, as Rector to Eyam  in 1664, with his wife Catherine, (daughter of Ralph Carr, Esq., of Cocken, County Durham).

In 1665 plague hit England, and a consignment of cloth bound for his village brought with it the infectious fleas which spread the disease. After an initial flurry of deaths in the autumn of that year it died down during the winter only to come back even more virulently in the spring of 1666. Mompesson, in conjunction with another clergyman, the ejected Puritan, Thomas Stanley, took the courageous decision to isolate the village. In all, 260 of the village's inhabitants, including his wife Catherine, died before the plague claimed its last victim in December 1666.  Mompesson became associated with the plague and was not universally welcomed at his next parish, Eakring, Nottinghamshire. In 1670 he remarried, his second wife being a widow, Elizabeth Newby. She was a relative of his patron, Sir George Saville, and through his patronage Mompesson eventually became Prebendary of Southwell, Nottinghamshire, although he declined the opportunity to be Dean of Lincoln Cathedral. He died in 1709.

This historic episode, commemorated each year in the village, has been the subject of many books and plays, notably The Roses of Eyam  by Don Taylor (1970). Recently academics have begun to examine the factual basis of the story's key ingredients: for example the extent to which wealthier residents were able to circumvent the ban. For example, despite insisting all villagers should remain in Eyam, Mompesson had his own children sent away to Sheffield in June 1666, just before the quarantine was agreed. At this time he also desired to send his wife Catherine with them but she refused to leave him, later succumbing to the plague.

Mompesson did many things to help the village during the plague including preventing the spread of it by filling pockets drilled in the Boundary Stone full of vinegar for trading. This helped stop the spread of the plague by sterilising any coins that came in or out of Eyam. "Mompesson's Well", listed at Grade II by Historic England, is a substantial well on the edge of the village and another site for the exchange of payment for food and other essentials left by neighbouring parishioners.

See also
St Lawrence's Church, Eyam

References

1639 births
1709 deaths
17th-century English Anglican priests
History of Derbyshire
Alumni of Peterhouse, Cambridge
Clergy from Leeds
People from Eyam